Anania terrealis is a species of moth of the family Crambidae that is found in Europe. The insect has a wingspan of 24–28 mm, flies from June to August depending on the location, and has larvae that feed on Solidago virgaurea and asters.

External links 
 Algedonia terrealis at UKmoths

Pyraustinae
Moths of Europe
Moths described in 1839